Michael Robert Christopher Mason (born 30 September 1986) is a Canadian high jumper. The 2004 World Junior champion, he has represented Canada at the 2008 Summer Olympics, 2008 IAAF World Indoor Championships, 2010 Commonwealth Games, 2012 Summer Olympics, 2014 Commonwealth Games, 2014 IAAF World Indoor Championships and the 2015 Pan American Games. His personal best for the event is 2.33 metres.

Career
He won the IAAF World Junior Championships gold medal in 2004. From Nanoose Bay, British Columbia, Mason is only the second Canadian to win a World Junior Championship gold medal, following Mark Boswell who won in 1996. Mason holds a number of provincial records previously held by retired Canadian high jumper and 1976 Olympic Silver Medallist Greg Joy, including the BC high school, junior and senior records.

Following his world junior win, he set the current NAIA record as a member of the UBC Thunderbirds and was the bronze medalist at the 2006 NACAC U-23 Championships. He jumped a personal best of 2.27 m to win the Canadian title in 2007 Canadian Senior Championships. He is a member of the Valley Royals Track and Field Club and is coached by Ziggy Szelagowicz.

In 2008 Mason improved his personal best during the indoor season, to 2.30 in January in Seattle. At the 2008 World Indoor Championships he finished eighth. He made his Olympic debut a few months later at the 2008 Beijing Olympics and placed eighth in his qualifying group with a jump of 2.25 m, although he missed the final. Competing as a student-athlete, he took the silver medal in the high jump at the 2009 Summer Universiade. The year after he represented Canada at the 2010 Commonwealth Games with a seventh-place finish in the final.

He cleared 2.31 m for the first time at the Baie-Mahault Grand Prix in Guadeloupe, winning the event with a meet record mark. In 2015 Mason improved his indoor personal best to 2.31m at the Millrose Games and his outdoor best to 2.33m at the Edmonton Track Classic.

In the leadup to the 2020 Summer Olympics in Tokyo, Mason came second at the Canadian track and field trials, behind Django Lovett. He was thus named to the Canadian Olympic team. Competing at the Olympic high jump event, he ranked fourteenth in the qualification round and did not advance to the final.

Honours
In 2012 Mason was awarded the Queen Elizabeth II Diamond Jubilee Medal.

Achievements

References

External links
 
 
 
 
 
 

1986 births
Living people
Canadian male high jumpers
Sportspeople from British Columbia
Olympic track and field athletes of Canada
Athletes (track and field) at the 2008 Summer Olympics
Athletes (track and field) at the 2010 Commonwealth Games
Athletes (track and field) at the 2012 Summer Olympics
Athletes (track and field) at the 2014 Commonwealth Games
Athletes (track and field) at the 2015 Pan American Games
Athletes (track and field) at the 2016 Summer Olympics
Athletes (track and field) at the 2020 Summer Olympics
Athletes (track and field) at the 2018 Commonwealth Games
Athletes (track and field) at the 2019 Pan American Games
University of British Columbia alumni
Pan American Games silver medalists for Canada
World Athletics Championships athletes for Canada
Commonwealth Games medallists in athletics
Commonwealth Games bronze medallists for Canada
Pan American Games medalists in athletics (track and field)
Universiade medalists in athletics (track and field)
Universiade silver medalists for Canada
Pan American Games track and field athletes for Canada
Medalists at the 2019 Pan American Games
Medalists at the 2015 Pan American Games
Medallists at the 2014 Commonwealth Games